Club de Fútbol La Piedad is a Mexican football club based in La Piedad, Michoacán. The club currently plays in the Liga Premier de Ascenso de Mexico in the Liga Premier. Reboceros was founded in 1951 by football players from "Perros Bravos" neighborhood, most of them were craftsman working with leather and textile.

History

First years of the club
The club was founded in 1951. In 1952, the team won the Second Division and was promoted to Primera División, however, the squad was relegated in 1953. After 1953 relegation, the team would spend several years playing in the Second Division and Primera División 'A'. In 2001 the club won the Verano 2001 championship defeating Toros Neza. Later, La Piedad won the promotion to the First Division by winning Gallos de Aguascalientes in the promotion playoff.

Return to Primera División and first disappearance of the club
La Piedad returned to Primera División in the Invierno 2001 tournament, the team finished in 18th place with 19 points. In Verano 2002 tournament, La Piedad finished the regular season in the first place of the general table. Being eliminated by Pumas UNAM in the quarterfinals, the team was managed by Víctor Manuel Vucetich.

During the season, the team had to face criticism from own players, rival teams and the media, which accused the club and the city of not having the facilities or adequate urban infrastructure for the First Division. Finally, the team was moved from La Piedad to Querétaro and was renamed as Gallos Blancos de Querétaro.

The original La Piedad franchise disappeared in 2004, after the Mexican Football Federation (FMF) decided to reduce the number of participants in the First Division to 18 clubs. The FMF bought the Gallos Blancos franchise for the lack of transparency regarding the origin of its financial resources and decided to disappear it.

Ascenso MX Teams
After original La Piedad team was moved to Querétaro, a new franchise arrived to the city: Tampico Madero adopted the name and colors of Reboceros on Invierno 2002 tournament. The new La Piedad franchise arrived to the tournament final against Irapuato, finally, the Irapuato won the championship, in January 2003, La Piedad was moved to Celaya and was renamed as Cajeteros del Celaya.

In 2004, Guadalajara moved its reserve squad to La Piedad and was named as Chivas La Piedad, however the team only played for one season in the city, because they did not receive the support of local fans. In July 2005 the franchise was moved to Tepic.

In June 2009, an Ascenso MX football club from the neighboring state of Guanajuato, Petroleros de Salamanca, relocated to La Piedad. The club changed its name to Club de Fútbol La Piedad, and four years later the club was promoted to Liga MX after defeating Neza FC in a promotion play-off. The club had asked permission to relocate from La Piedad before the new season began.  The club was subsequently renamed when Fidel Kuri Grajales, the owner from Veracruz decided to liquidate the club to use its Liga MX license for their Ascenso MX team Tiburones Rojos de Veracruz.

Segunda División Teams
La Piedad maintained a reserve team in Silao, this team played in Liga de Nuevos Talentos, the Reboceritos de La Piedad, this squad was relocated in La Piedad and became the main team in July 2013.

In June 2016, La Piedad bought an expansion place in the Liga Premier de Ascenso. The new team, officially called Club de Fútbol Reboceros was the product of an alliance between the City Council and football players Flavio and Duilio Davino.

In 2017, the Davino brothers sold their participation in the club, which was acquired by José Trinidad Melgoza, a local businessman. In Clausura 2018, La Piedad was a finalist of the championship, being defeated by Loros UdeC.

In June 2018, new members arrived to the board that administers the club, the brothers Carlos Adrián and Ramón Morales. Melgoza left the direction and took his project to Real Zamora, a team from the same region as La Piedad.

Under the new directive, the team began to suffer economic problems, finally in December 2018, Melgoza returned to Reboceros acquiring 90% of the team, the remaining 10% of the shares belong to the City of La Piedad. With the second stage of Melgoza, Reboceros de La Piedad and Real Zamora went to share ownership, for this reason a collaboration between both clubs began, which consists mainly of the exchange of players and staff of the two teams with the aim of creating a project to promote regional football.

In July 2020 Melgoza sold the franchise to Promotora Deportiva Valladolid, a group of businessmen headed by Heriberto Morales and José Alfredo Pérez Ferrer. Pérez Ferrer was appointed as President of the club, while Claudio da Silva was elected as Vice President. La Piedad's project was merged with one that intended to bring a team to Morelia after the departure of Monarcas, however, upon winning another offer, it was decided to combine both. For this reason, Marco Antonio Figueroa and Carlos Bustos were chosen as sports advisers for La Piedad.

Honours

National
Ascenso MX: (2)
Verano 2001, Apertura 2012

Campeon de Ascenso: (2)
2001-02, 2012–13

Segunda División Profesional: (1)
1951-1952

Segunda División "B": (2)
1984-1985, 1993-1994

Current squad

First-team squad

Reserve teams
Huetamo F.C. 
Reserve team that plays in the Liga TDP, the fourth level of the Mexican league system.

Notable players
 Claudinho da Silva
 Felipe Flores
 Rolando Fonseca
 Óscar Emilio Rojas
 Iván Hurtado
 Francisco Fonseca
 Rafael Medina
 Christian Patiño
 Daniel Rosello
 Ramon Morales
 Arturo Magaña

Managers
 Jorge Enrique Correa (July 2010–Aug 10)
 Antonio Ascencio Meza (Sept 2010–Dec 10)
 Marco Trejo (Jan 2011–March 11)
 Cristóbal Ortega (July 2011–May 13)

References

External links
Official site

Football clubs in Michoacán
Association football clubs established in 1951
Liga Premier de México
1951 establishments in Mexico